Antoine Marie Charles Garnier called "Garnier de l'Aube", born on 7 September 1742 in Troyes and died on 9 September 1805 at Blaincourt-sur-Aube (Aube), was a politician during the French Revolution. He took part in the coup, organized by Laurent Lecointre, etc. which led to the Fall of Robespierre. According to some authors, he was the one who launched on 9 Thermidor, when Robespierre was temporarily unable to speak: "It is the blood of Danton that chokes you!". The sentence, however, is sometimes attributed to Louis Legendre. During the Directoire he was a member of the Conseil des Cinq-Cents.

1742 births
1805 deaths